Kathryn Carver Hall (born Catherine Drum; August 24, 1899 – July 17, 1947) was an American actress.

Career
Carver played in motion pictures during a brief career from 1925 to 1929. She co-starred with Adolphe Menjou in Service For Ladies (1927) and His Private Life (1928).

Personal life and death 
Carver was married first to photographer Ira L. Hill. They were divorced on May 2, 1927. Carver married Menjou in 1928 and they divorced in 1934. On January 9, 1936, she wed broker Paul Vincent Hall in Armonk Village, New York.

She had a nervous breakdown after the death of her sister in 1932. She  retired from making motion pictures in 1934. Carver asked for a temporary allowance of $2,300 per month from Menjou's estimated income of $15,000, when she sued him for divorce. Carver's top salary as an actress was in 1928 when she earned $500 per week.

On July 17, 1947, Carver died at Horace Harding Hospital in Elmhurst, Queens. Her residence was at 3505 167th, Flushing, Queens. She was buried in Mount St. Mary's Cemetery in Flushing, New York.

Partial filmography
The Wanderer (1925)
When Love Grows Cold (1926)
 The Yankee Señor (1926)
Service for Ladies (1927)
Serenade (1927)
Beware of Widows (1927)
Outcast (1928)
His Private Life (1928)
No Defense (1929)

References
 

Washington Post, Spouse of Menjou Mystified by Suit, October 24, 1932, Page 10.
Washington Post, 2,300 a Month Asked By Kathryn Carver, July 28, 1933, Page 3.
Washington Post, Kathryn Carver Hall, July 18, 1947, Page B2.

External links

Kathryn Carver at Virtual History

American silent film actresses
Actresses from New York City
1899 births
1947 deaths
20th-century American actresses